Lohjanjärvi (also known as Lake Lohja) is a lake located in the Uusimaa region of Finland. The majority of the lake is located within the borders of the city of Lohja and smaller parts in the municipality of Karjalohja and in the city of Raseborg. The lake drains into the Gulf of Finland through Mustionjoki (also known as Karjaanjoki). Together with Hiidenvesi, which drains into the gulf from the north, Lohjanjärvi is a part of the Karjaanjoki basin.

See also
List of lakes in Finland

References

Karjaanjoki basin
Lakes of Raseborg
Lakes of Lohja